Y. C. James Yen (1890/1893-1990), known to his many English speaking friends as "Jimmy," was a Chinese educator and organizer known for his work in mass literacy and rural reconstruction, first in China, then in many countries.

After working with Chinese laborers in France during World War I, in the 1920s Yen first organized the National Association of Mass Education Movements to bring literacy to the Chinese masses, then turned to the villages of China to organize Rural Reconstruction, most famously at Ding Xian, (or, in the spelling of the time, Ting Hsien), a county in Hebei, from 1926-1937. He was instrumental in founding the Joint Commission on Rural Reconstruction in 1948, which then moved to Taiwan. In 1952, Dr. Yen organized the Philippine Rural Reconstruction Movement and in 1960, he established the International Institute of Rural Reconstruction.

He returned to China in the 1980s but died in New York in 1990.

Biography
Born to a scholarly but not wealthy family in Bazhong, Sichuan, in 1890, Yen was sent to a school run by the China Inland Mission, studied at Hong Kong University, and graduated in 1918 from Yale University, where he was a member of Beta Theta Pi fraternity. After graduation he went to France to join the work of the International YMCA with the Chinese Labor Corps in France workers who had been sent to support the Allies in World War I. Working with them to read and write letters, Yen recalled, he found "for the first time in my ignorant intellectual life" the value of the common people of his own country. What they lacked was education. Therefore, Yen wrote a widely copied literacy primer which used 1,000 basic characters.

After earning a master's degree from Princeton University and serving as President of the Chinese Students Christian Association, Yen returned to China in 1921 to head national mass literacy campaigns under the Chinese National YMCA. In 1923, Yen and leading intellectuals such as Liang Qichao, Hu Shih, and Tao Xingzhi formed  the National Association of Mass Education Movements (MEM). The MEM organized campaigns across the country which coordinated volunteer teachers, local leaders, and any available location in order to attract students who could not pay high tuitions. Among the volunteer teachers was Mao Zedong. These campaigns attracted more than five million students and served as a model for even more widespread schools.

Yen later recalled that at this time he regarded himself not as a "Christian," which implied membership in a church, but as a "follower of Christ," implying a direct relation with Jesus. He criticized most missionaries for not being in touch with the realities of China but enthusiastically welcomed the support of those Chinese and foreign Christian organizations which addressed the problems of the village.

In 1926, the MEM set up a village campaign in Ding Xian, a county some 200 miles south of Beijing. The Ting Hsien Experiment (in the romanization of the time) used People’s Schools to coordinate innovations ranging from hybrid pigs and economic cooperatives to village drama and Village Health Workers.  Yen joined Liang Shuming and other independent reformers to form a National Rural Reconstruction Movement which included several hundred local and national organizations. The Rural Reconstruction Movement aimed to create a new countryside as the basis for a new Chinese nation. The work at Ding Xian attracted nationwide attention and developed many new techniques for rural development which did not depend on central government control, violent revolution, or large infusions of foreign money.

In 1937 the Japanese invasion drove MEM operations first to Hunan, then to Sichuan, but Yen spent much of the war in Washington, D.C. After 1945, Yen found himself increasingly at odds with the Nationalist government’s military preoccupation; in 1948 he persuaded the American Congress to fund an independent Sino-American Joint Commission on Rural Reconstruction, of which he became one of the Commissioners. In 1950, when his work in China was halted by the incoming Communist government, Yen led the Philippine Rural Reconstruction Movement and founded the International Institute of Rural Reconstruction, with headquarters in the Philippines.

In 1985 the Chinese government finally welcomed Yen back to China and acknowledged his immense contribution to Mass Education and Rural Reconstruction. He died in New York City in the fall of 1990.

Legacy 
In the late 1990s and early 2000s, the New Rural Reconstruction Movement took up Yen's name and legacy to address the problems of the countryside created by the success of the globalized economy. In July 2003, grassroots activists founded the James Yen Institute for Rural Reconstruction in Dingzhou, the site of the MEM's activities before the war.

Yen's charismatic speaking style and forceful personality made him attractive to many groups in China as well as many foreign friends. The China-raised American author Pearl Buck published a short book of interviews with Yen, Tell The People; Talks With James Yen About the Mass Education Movement (New York: John Day, 1945).

John Hersey, whose father was a missionary in China who worked with Yen in the 1920s, wrote a novel The Call (New York: Knopf, 1984), which includes an only slightly fictionalized portrait of Yen under the name "Johnny Wu."

Works
 
 
  Translated as: 
 .

References

Notes

Bibliography

Further reading
Wu Hsiang-hsiang, Yan Yangchu Zhuan (Biography of Yan Yangchu; Taipei: 1981)

External links

 Records of the International Institute for Rural Reconstruction, Butler Library, Columbia University. Mostly from the period after 1944.
 There is an extensive article that can be found by searching "晏阳初" (Yan Yangchu) at 百度百科 (baidu.com), (in Chinese), including links to films and interviews. 

Educators from Sichuan
Sichuanese Protestants
Chinese Protestants
1890 births
1990 deaths
Alumni of St. Paul's College, Hong Kong
Alumni of the University of Hong Kong
Alumni of St. John's Hall, University of Hong Kong
Yale University alumni
People from Bazhong
Ramon Magsaysay Award winners
American people of Chinese descent
American educators of Asian descent
Chinese expatriates in the United States
Chinese expatriates in France
YMCA leaders